Aulopareia is a genus of gobies native to the western Pacific Ocean where members of this genus can be found in marine, fresh and brackish waters.

Species
There are currently three recognized species in this genus:
 Aulopareia atripinnatus (H. M. Smith, 1931)
 Aulopareia janetae H. M. Smith, 1945 (Scalycheek goby)
 Aulopareia unicolor (Valenciennes, 1837)

References

Gobiidae